Serine/threonine-protein kinase Nek9 is an enzyme that in humans is encoded by the NEK9 gene.

Interactions 

NEK9 has been shown to interact with:
 NEK6, 
 RAN, and
 SSRP1.

Model organisms 

Model organisms have been used in the study of NEK9 function. A conditional knockout mouse line called Nek9tm1a(EUCOMM)Wtsi was generated at the Wellcome Trust Sanger Institute. Male and female animals underwent a standardized phenotypic screen to determine the effects of deletion. Additional screens performed:  - In-depth immunological phenotyping

References

Further reading 

 
 
 
 
 
 
 
 
 

Human proteins